You're the Only One (no Cantonese title) is a 1990 Cantonese album recorded by Chinese Cantopop singer Faye Wong as 王靖雯 Wong Ching Man, when she was based in Hong Kong.

Track listing
美麗的震盪 (Mei Lai Dik Zan Dong) - Beautiful Vibration
又繼續等 (Jau Gai Zuk Dang) - Still Waiting
然後某天 (Jin Hau Mau Tin) - And Then one Day
悶人咖啡 (Mun Jan Gaa Fe) - Boring Coffee
無原因 (Mou Jyun Jan) - No Reason
多得他 (Do Dak Taa) - Because Of Him (ATV Version: Your Intima-Norman Cheung)
只有你 (Zi Jau Nei) - Only You
靜夜的單簧管 (Zing Je Dik Daan Wong Gun) - Clarinet In A Quiet Night
明年今夜 (Ming Nin Gam Je) - Next Year Tonight
不裝飾 (	Bat Zong Sik) - No Decorations

References

1990 albums
Faye Wong albums
Cinepoly Records albums
Cantopop albums